The corpus cavernosum of clitoris is one of a pair of sponge-like regions of erectile tissue of the clitoris. It is made of a sponge-like tissue that fills with blood during clitoral erection. This is homologous to the corpus cavernosum penis. The term corpora cavernosa literally means "cave-like bodies".

Structure 

The two corpora cavernosa are expandable erectile tissues of the clitoris. They are joined together along their medial surfaces by an incomplete fibrous septum. Each corpus cavernosum is connected to the rami of the pubis and ischium by a clitoral crus. There is connection to the ischiocavernosus muscle. Each can be up to 7 cm long in an adult.

Development 
The corpus cavernosum is homologous to the corpus cavernosum penis in the male. It develops from the genital tubercle in the embryo.

The clitoris also has two vestibular bulbs beneath the skin of the labia minora (at the entrance to the vagina), which expand at the same time as the glans clitoridis to cap the ends of the corpora cavernosa. This is homologous with the corpus spongiosum of the male anatomy.

Microanatomy 
The corpus cavernosum is made of a sponge-like tissue. This contains irregular blood-filled spaces, lined by endothelium, and separated by connective tissue septa.

Function 
The corpora cavernosa fill with blood during clitoral erection. Their size increases 2 fold to 3 fold. In some circumstances, release of nitric oxide precedes relaxation of the clitoral cavernosal artery and nearby muscle, in a process similar to male arousal. More blood flows in through the clitoral cavernosal artery, the pressure in the corpora cavernosa clitoridis rises. The clitoris is engorged with blood. This leads to extrusion of the glans clitoridis and enhanced sensitivity to physical contact.

Clinical significance 
The corpora cavernosa can reduce in size before the menopause. This can impair sexual function in some women.

History 
The term corpora cavernosa means "cave-like bodies".

References

External links 

Clitoris